was a Japanese football club based in Takasaki, Gunma Prefecture, formerly of the Japan Football League from 2007 until 2011 season. Their team colours were black and red.

Arte means art in Italian, Portuguese and Spanish.

History
The club was founded as Makkī F.C. Kantō in 1996. Educational Corporation Horikoshi Gakuen took over the club in 2000. The reorganised club was briefly called Gunma F.C. Fortona but rebranded as Gunma F.C. Horikoshi due to a trademark issue.

The club won all the games in the 2000 Gunma Prefecture League Division 2. They won the 2001 Division 1 championship again without dropping any point. They won the Kanto Regional League Division 1 in 2003 and gained a JFL status in 2004 after winning the play-off.

In 2005, they dropped "Gunma" from their name. It is widely believed that this was a move to appeal more to people in Takasaki area rather than whole Gunma after Thespa Kusatsu became the first J. League side in the prefecture.

In January 2006, they adopted new name Arte Takasaki.

The 2007 season has taken a new tumble for them, already guaranteed a last place finish, and will need to rely on at least one team's promotion to J2 to avoid relegation. Losing to Gifu on the last day of the season 2–0, they were theoretically guaranteed a reprieve that was made official once Gifu and Kumamoto were approved for promotion to J2.

In 2008, they fared not much better, finishing with only Mitsubishi Mizushima below them, and again they were reprieved when Tochigi, Toyama and Okayama were promoted.

Following a fairly safe 2009, the team again stood at the tip of relegation after finishing 17th in 2010, but kept their place in the division by defeating company team Sanyo Sumoto S.C., the 3rd place team from the Regional Promotion Series tournament, in a promotion/relegation series.

After many financial problems, the club was excluded from Japan Football League in January 2012 after final season of Arte Takasaki in 2011 season when that club was dissolution.

Stadiums
They played their home games mainly in Takasaki Hamakawa Athletic Stadium but also use Shikishima Athletic Stadium and Shikishima Soccer and Rugby Stadium in Maebashi.  The club tried to persuade the local governments concerned to build a soccer-specific stadium on the former Takasaki Horserace Track site.  However, it is not clear how the site will be utilised in the future because many different parties such as the prefecture, the city and private entities have their titles to the site and it seems to take time to solve the issue.

Results in JFL
As of the end 2011 season.

Retired number
To commemorate Kosuke Kato who died of a heart attack during a practice session in February 2005, his number 30 is retired.

References

External links
(Japanese) Official Website

Association football clubs established in 1996
Sports teams in Gunma Prefecture
1996 establishments in Japan
2011 disestablishments in Japan
Defunct football clubs in Japan
Association football clubs disestablished in 2011
Japan Football League clubs